Odontobutis sinensis is a species of freshwater sleeper endemic to China.

References

Freshwater fish of China
Odontobutis
Fish described in 2002